Lisa Lockhart (born November 11, 1965) is an American professional rodeo cowgirl who specializes in barrel racing. In December 2014 and 2016, she won the Average at the National Finals Rodeo (NFR) in Las Vegas, Nevada.

Life
Lockhart was born on November 11, 1965, in Wolf Point, Montana. Lockhart started riding at 6-years-old with a pony. Her two sisters were key in drawing her into competition. Lockhart graduated from Montana State University. She then turned her amateur career into a professional one.

She is the aunt of 2017 and 2019 Professional Bull Riders World Champion Jess Lockwood.

Career
Lockhart joined the WPRA in 1993. In addition to being a two-time NFR Average Champion, Lockhart has the second most qualifications to the NFR with 13, with Charmayne James and Sherry Cervi tied for first with 19 each. She is in 8th place for most money won at an NFR with $151,731 in 2016. For WPRA Career Earnings Leaders through 2018, she is second only to Sherry Cervi with $2,425,713.Barrel Racing Average Champions 1959 – 2020, p. 8.</ref> She is also a two-time winner of the RFD-TV American Rodeo.

Lockhart is in the top four fastest NFR Average times ever recorded to date as follows:
 2017 137.32 seconds Nellie Miller
 2016 137.98 seconds Lisa Lockhart
 2015 140.41 seconds Callie duPerier
 2014 144.93 seconds Lisa Lockhart

Lockhart won the Guy Weadick Award from the Calgary Stampede in 2016.

2019 season
Lockhart qualified for the NFR in the 2019 season. Her season earnings are $146,352. She finished 3rd in the World Rankings. Her career earnings to date are $2,572,065.

Highlights from this season include winning the following rodeos: the Tri-State Rodeo in Fort Madison, Iowa; the McCone County Fair PRCA Rodeo in Circle, Montana; the BHSU Rally Rode and Bullfights in Spearfish, South Dakota; the Killdeer PRCA Rodeo in Killdeer, North Dakota; the Calgary Stampede in Calgary, Alberta.

2018 season summary
In the 2018 season, Lockhart placed #4 in the World Standings. Her total year earnings were $123.515. Her back number was 39. Her NFR qualifications were 12 (2007-2018). To date, Lockhart's total career earnings are $2,378,482.

Horses
Her prominent horse is named "An Oakie With Cash", nicknamed Louie out of Biebers Oakie by Lady Kaweah Cash. Louie is a 18-year-old buckskin (horse) gelding as of 2021.
 In 2011, Louie was voted the Horse with the Most Heart award (presented in memory of Rockem Sockem Go “Rocky” owned by Kelly Kaminski)
 In 2019, Louie tied for third for the AQHA/WPRA Horse of the Year

Another of her horses is nicknamed "Rosa" out of Corona Cartel by Dash Ta Vanila. She is an 11-year-old buckskin mare as of 2021.
She owns one other horse registered name Prime Diamond, nicknamed Cutter. He is a 10-year-old black gelding by Prime Talent, out of Hugos Diamond.

Career summary
Lockhart has qualified for the NFR 15 times. She has won the NFR Average Champion twice. She has won the Ram Nationals Finals Circuit Rodeo one time. She won the Elite Rodeo Athlete (ERA) title, and the American Rodeo twice. She has almost $2 million in career earnings. She has finished in the top 5 in the World Standings every year for the last five years. She is the Pro Rodeo Canadian Ladies Barrel Racing Champion for 2006 with $54,412, 2008 with $58,598, 2012 with $66,268, and 2013 with $88,649.

Personal
In 1994, she married her husband Grady, a professional tie-down roper. They have three children. Lockhart spends her time off riding young horses and spending time with her children. She and her family reside in Oelrichs, South Dakota, a small town of 126 at the 2010 census.

References

Bibliography

External links 
 Louie's pedigree
 Women's Professional Rodeo Association
 Professional Rodeo Cowboys Association
 National Finals Rodeo

1965 births
Living people
People from Wolf Point, Montana
People from Fall River County, South Dakota
American barrel racers
American female equestrians
21st-century American women